The 2017–18 Libyan Premier League was the 45th season of the Libyan Premier League, the top Libyan professional league for association football clubs, since its establishment in 1963. The season started on 15 August 2017 and concluded on 13 June 2018.

1 The 2017-18 season was used to determine the teams that will compete in 2018 and 2018-19 CAF competitions.

Teams 
Due to the continued security situation in Libya in 2017 and the difficulty in air-travel for most teams, the participating teams were grouped by their geographical location into four groups of seven teams. Teams from each group were scheduled to play every team from their group in a home-and-away round robin format with 3 points given for a win and 1 point for a draw.

Stadiums 
Neutral stadiums were identified within each region to host group games. Matches are to be played without spectators.

First round

Group 1

Group 2

Group 3

Group 4

CAF competitions playoff
The leader of the four groups after the first round at the end of 2017 compete in the CAF competition playoff (also known as quadruple round), which is used to determine the Libyan teams which qualified for the 2018 CAF Champions League and 2018 CAF Confederation Cup.

Semifinals
November 16

Al-Ahli Tripoli     0-2 Al-Tahaddi

Al-Ahli Benghazi    1-2 Al-Ittihad Tripoli

Final
Winner qualified for 2018 CAF Champions League. Loser qualified for 2018 CAF Confederation Cup.

November 25

Al-Ittihad Tripoli  1-2 Al-Tahaddi

Second round
The second round of the Libyan Premier League started on 20 January 2018. Results are combined with first round.

Group 1

Group 2

Group 3

Group 4

Championship playoff
<onlyinclude><onlyinclude>

Relegation playoff

References

External links
Libyan Premier League 2017/2018, Goalzz.com

Libyan Premier League seasons
Libya